The Scouts Battalion is a battalion of the Estonian Land Forces. It is a part of the 1st Infantry Brigade and acts as its rapid response unit. The battalion is currently based at Tapa.

History

Estonian War of Independence
In November 1918, Estonian American entrepreneur and scouting enthusiast Henry Reissar returned to Estonia and turned to the Ministry of Defence (then Ministry of War) with a proposition of forming a voluntary military unit, financed by himself, in order to help defend Estonia. Having received such permission, the unit was formed on 21 December 1918, in Viljandi, where the first volunteers took their oaths in the ruins of Viljandi Castle, and Friedrich-Karl Pinka was appointed commander of the newly formed unit. On 3 January 1919, the company-sized unit was sent to the front against the Red Army. On 23 January 1919, a 43-man unit of Scouts captured the Pikksaare Train Station, defended by 524 Red Army troops. The Scouts fought mostly alongside armoured train units and acquitted themselves well in combat, manifesting greater morale than the regular conscript units. The Scouts took part in several major battles including the attack against the Krasnaya Gorka fort in October 1919 and the Battle of Krivasoo in November – December 1919. On 1 December 1919, the Scouts Regiment was formed as a part of the Armoured Train Division.

1920–1940
After the signing of the Peace Treaty of Tartu, many servicemen were demobilized and returned to civilian life. From 1921-28, the Scouts unit was reduced in size and continued to serve as a part of the 2nd, 5th, 6th and 10th Infantry Regiment. On 1 October 1928, the unit was renamed Scouts Single Infantry Battalion. The battalion was based at Tallinn, from where it was moved to Uuemõisa in 1932. After the Soviet occupation in 1940, the battalion was disbanded.

2001–present
The Scouts Battalion was restored on 29 March 2001, as a fully professional unit. The Scouts Battalion has actively participated in international operations together with other NATO, European Union and United Nations member states, including the Iraq War and the War in Afghanistan. The battalion is currently equipped with Combat Vehicle 90 infantry fighting vehicles and Patria Pasi armoured personnel carriers.

Current structure
Scouts Battalion:

 Battalion Headquarters
 A Infantry Company
 B Infantry Company
 C Infantry Company
 Combat Support Company
 Staff and Support Company

List of commanders
Artur Tiganik 2001–2004
Indrek Sirel 2005–2006
Aivar Kokka 2006–2009
Vahur Karus 2009–2013
Andrus Merilo 2013–2016
Tarmo Kundla 2016–2019
Eero Aija 2019-present

See also
1st Infantry Brigade

References

External links

Official website

Military history of Estonia
Estonian War of Independence
Battalions of Estonia
Military units and formations established in 1918
1918 establishments in Estonia